The 2017 Conference USA men's soccer tournament was the 23rd edition of the tournament. It determined Conference USA's automatic berth into the 2017 NCAA Division I Men's Soccer Championship.

The 2nd-seeded Old Dominion Monarchs won the CUSA title on their home field, for their second CUSA championship. The Monarchs defeated Charlotte in the championship, 1–0.

Seeding 

The top seven programs qualified for the CUSA Tournament.

Bracket

Results

Quarterfinals

Semifinals

Final

Awards

See also 
 2017 Conference USA Women's Soccer Tournament

References 

Conference USA Men's Soccer Tournament
Conference USA Men's Soccer Tournament
Conference USA Men's Soccer Tournament